HD 146389 (also known as WASP-38), is a star with a yellow-white hue in the northern constellation of Hercules. The star was given the formal name Irena by the International Astronomical Union in January 2020. It is invisible to the naked eye with an apparent visual magnitude of 9.4 The star is located at a distance of approximately 446 light years from the Sun based on parallax, but is drifting closer with a radial velocity of −9 km/s. The star is known to host one exoplanet, designated WASP-38b or formally named 'Iztok'.

The stellar classification of HD 146389 is F8, which is an F-type star of uncertain luminosity class. The age of the star is uncertain. It shows a low lithium abundance, which suggests an age of more than 5 billion years. However, the rotation rate indicates an age closer to one billion. The study in 2015 utilizing Chandra X-ray Observatory, have failed to detect any X-ray emissions from the star during planetary eclipse, which may indicate an unusually low coronal activity or the presence of absorbing gas ring formed by atmosphere escaping planet WASP-38 b. The star is 33% larger and 20% more massive than the Sun. It is radiating nearly three times the luminosity of the Sun at an effective temperature of 6,150 K.

Planetary system 
The "hot Jupiter" class planet WASP-38 b, later named 'Iztok', was discovered around HD 146389 in 2010. The planet is losing significant amount of gas, estimated to 0.023 Earth masses per billion years. In 2013, it was found the planetary orbit is surprisingly well aligned with the rotational axis of the parent star, despite of the noticeable orbital eccentricity.

A 2012 study, utilizing a Rossiter–McLaughlin effect, have determined the orbital plane of WASP-38b is poorly constrained but probably aligned with the equatorial plane of the star, misalignment equal to 15°.

References 

F-type main-sequence stars
Planetary systems with one confirmed planet
Planetary transit variables
Hercules (constellation)
J16155036+1001572
146389
Irena
38